Miodrag Vukotić (born 8 November 1973) is a Montenegrin retired footballer who played as a defender.

Playing career

Club
Born in Titograd, SR Montenegro, back in SFR Yugoslavia (nowadays Podgorica, Montenegro), during his adventurous career, he played for FK Budućnost Podgorica and FK Vojvodina, before moving to Italy, where he started with a short 6-month spell with A.C. Milan, then later to Empoli on loan. He continued his career at Swiss club BSC Young Boys, Montenegrin clubs FK Mogren and FK Zeta, German club Waldhof Mannheim and finally, Austrian club SV Ried. He returned to Montenegro to play for FK Mladost Podgorica.

Managerial career
Vukotić started his managerial career at Mladost Podgorica, where he was sacked in April 2013. He replaced Dragan Radojičić as manager of Budućnost in June 2015.

In September 2017 he signed a two-year contract with Rudar Pljevlja, but was dismissed as manager in June 2018.

References

External links
 Early career stats at RSSSF - Yugoslav players and coaches in Italy.

1973 births
Living people
Footballers from Podgorica
Association football central defenders
Yugoslav footballers
Serbia and Montenegro footballers
Montenegrin footballers
FK Budućnost Podgorica players
FK Vojvodina players
A.C. Milan players
Empoli F.C. players
BSC Young Boys players
FK Mogren players
SV Waldhof Mannheim players
FK Zeta players
SV Ried players
Kapfenberger SV players
OFK Titograd players
Yugoslav First League players
First League of Serbia and Montenegro players
Serie A players
2. Bundesliga players
Austrian Football Bundesliga players
Montenegrin First League players
Serbia and Montenegro expatriate footballers
Expatriate footballers in Italy
Serbia and Montenegro expatriate sportspeople in Italy
Expatriate footballers in Switzerland
Serbia and Montenegro expatriate sportspeople in Switzerland
Expatriate footballers in Germany
Serbia and Montenegro expatriate sportspeople in Germany
Expatriate footballers in Austria
Serbia and Montenegro expatriate sportspeople in Austria
Montenegrin football managers
OFK Titograd managers
FK Budućnost Podgorica managers
FK Rudar Pljevlja managers